Pierre Gourou (31 August 1900 – 13 May 1999) was a French geographer. In 1984, he received the Patron's Medal from the Royal Geographical Society.

Further reading
 Paul Claval: Pierre Gourou 1900–1999, in Geographers: Biobibliographical Studies 25, 2006, pp. 60–80.

1900 births
1999 deaths
French geographers
People from Tunis
20th-century geographers